Bernd Dreher (born 2 November 1966) is a German former professional football player, who played as a goalkeeper, and a current goalkeeper coach. He last worked at Ludogorets Razgrad.

Career
Dreher originally retired in summer 2003, taking up the role of Bayern youth goalkeeping coach and lending a hand to senior counterpart Sepp Maier in his efforts to keep Oliver Kahn and Michael Rensing in peak form. "I'm actually training more now than when I was a full professional," commented Dreher after taking part in practically every pre-season workout and tending one goal for the first team in practice matches and friendlies. For the 2005–06 campaign, Dreher was summoned out of "semi-retirement" and handed a new, one-year pro contract. "We've officially reactivated him. He's in such good shape, I'd have no hesitation picking him in any situation," coach Felix Magath said in praise of his new number three keeper, who became the oldest active player in the Bundesliga. Dreher was in goal for Bayern for one game in 2005–06, keeping a clean sheet against VfL Wolfsburg.

Honours
Bayer Leverkusen
 UEFA Cup: 1987–88

Bayern Munich
 Bundesliga: 1996–97, 1998–99, 1999–2000, 2000–01, 2002–03, 2005–06, 2007–08
 DFB-Pokal: 1997–98, 1999–2000, 2002–03, 2005–06, 2007–08
 DFB-Ligapokal: 1997, 1998, 1999, 2000, 2007
 UEFA Champions League: 2000–01
 Intercontinental Cup: 2001

References

External links
 

1966 births
Living people
Sportspeople from Leverkusen
German footballers
KFC Uerdingen 05 players
FC Bayern Munich footballers
FC Bayern Munich II players
Bayer 04 Leverkusen players
Bayer 04 Leverkusen II players
Association football goalkeepers
Bundesliga players
2. Bundesliga players
FC Bayern Munich non-playing staff
UEFA Champions League winning players
UEFA Cup winning players
Footballers from North Rhine-Westphalia
West German footballers